Connock is a surname. Notable people with the surname include:

 Jim Connock (1925–1991), English film editor
 John Connock (fl. 1554–1571), English politician
 Richard Connock (died  1620), MP
 John Connock (born 1631), English politician

See also
 Connick